Tasmania is one of Australia's states, and has established several state symbols and emblems.

Official symbols

See also
 List of symbols of states and territories of Australia
 Australian state colours

References

External links
 Emblems - Tasmanian Parliamentary Library Retrieved 18 March 2018.
 State symbols - Department of premier and cabinet Retrieved 18 March 2018.

Tasmania
Tasmania